Groupama–FDJ Continental Team is a professional road bicycle racing team which participates in elite races. The team registered with the UCI for the 2019 season.

Team roster

Major wins
2019
 Stage 4 Rhône-Alpes Isère Tour, Karl Patrick Lauk
 Stage 2 Giro della Valle d'Aosta, Kevin Inkelaar
 Paris–Tours Espoirs, Alexys Brunel
2020 
  National U23 Time Trial Championships, Alexandre Balmer
2021
 GP Adria Mobil, Marijn van den Berg
  Overall Tour d'Eure-et-Loir, Paul Penhoët
Stage 3, Paul Penhoët
 Stage 1 Rhône-Alpes Isère Tour, Marijn van den Berg
  National U23 Road Race Championships, Rait Ärm
  Overall Giro della Valle d'Aosta, Reuben Thompson
  Overall Baltic Chain Tour, Laurence Pithie
 Stage 2 Ronde de l'Isard, Lewis Askey
2022
 Youngster Coast Challenge, Jensen Plowright
 Stage 3 Tour de Normandie, Laurence Pithie
 Stage 5 Tour de Normandie, Paul Penhoët
  Overall Le Triptyque des Monts et Châteaux, Enzo Paleni
Stage 2, Jensen Plowright
 Liège–Bastogne–Liège Espoirs, Romain Grégoire
 Giro del Belvedere, Romain Grégoire
 Gran Premio Palio del Recioto, Romain Grégoire

National champions
2020
 Swiss U23 Time Trial, Alexandre Balmer
2021
 Estonian U23 Road Race, Rait Ärm

References

External links

Cycling teams established in 2019
UCI Continental Teams (Europe)
Cycling teams based in France